Lithocarpus indutus is a species of plant in the family Fagaceae. Some common names it goes by are bataruwa, pasang bodas, and pasang balung.

It is a tree endemic to Java in Indonesia.  It is a vulnerable species threatened by habitat loss.

References

indutus
Endemic flora of Java
Vulnerable plants
Taxonomy articles created by Polbot